Acropora clathrata, commonly known as lattice table coral is a species of stony corals belonging to the family Acroporidae.

The species is native to Indo-Central Pacific region where it is widespread from Madagascar to the Red Sea to Western Australia.

Per IUCN, the species has the status "least concern".

References

Acroporidae
Animals described in 1891